Wink, which stands for "Webapp Innovation Kit", is an open-source framework for building mobile web applications on devices such as the IPhone or Android (Android (operating system)). It is based on web technologies such as HTML, CSS, and JavaScript.

The project started in early 2009 at Orange Labs (France Telecom R&D). Since June 17, 2010, Wink is a project of the Dojo foundation

Wink toolkit provides all the basic functionalities of a JavaScript framework: from DOM manipulation to asynchronous HTTP requests and also some mobile oriented features like touch and gestures events handling.

Beyond that, wink toolkit offers advanced graphical components, like HTML 3D tag clouds and shapes or multitouch components.

Packages

Wink toolkit is divided into 8 packages

 core, which contains all the heart of the kit
 ui, for all the graphical components
 ux, interactions components
 mm, multimedia package
 net, for network related tasks
 api, to handle low level HTML5 features
 fx, for CSS transitions and transform (either 2D or 3D)
 math, a set of mathematic libraries

It also includes an "Easy caching" mechanism.

See also 
 Dojo Toolkit

External links
 Official wink toolkit site

JavaScript libraries